Nothing is a two act opera by the British composer David Bruce to a libretto by Glyn Maxwell, based on the award-winning novel of the same name by Janne Teller.

The opera was co-commissioned by the Royal Opera House, London, and Glyndebourne. The original production, directed by Bijan Sheibani, premiered at Glyndebourne in February 2016, featuring Glyndebourne Youth Opera and Southbank Sinfonia. The performances were conducted by Sian Edwards.

Roles

The opera has five principle roles and three smaller roles that are performed by members of the chorus. The chorus itself is written for young voices.

Synopsis
On the first day back at school one September, a boy called Pierre walks out of the class, climbs a plum tree, and declares that ‘nothing matters’. His classmates try without success to bring him down from the tree. Desperate to prove him wrong, they give up their childhood possessions to a bonfire, "a Pile of Meaning", so their tears will prove things matter.

When this makes no impression on Pierre, they decide to force one another to give up whatever is most important to each of them. This starts with toys and clothes, but soon escalates monstrously: one girl’s hair – the national flag – the corpse of a pet – a figure of Jesus – until finally, with Pierre still claiming life is pointless – the children give up body and soul in a terrible spiral of sacrifice.

Finally Pierre comes to see the ‘Pile of Meaning’. He climbs it, crying out that life is beautiful – because it means nothing. In rage and regret the children set upon him. He is never seen again. Years later at Christmas, the children, now adults from all walks of life, gather by the plum tree to hang purple baubles on its branches, in recognition that whatever it was they went through together, the life and death of Pierre meant something, and cannot be forgotten.

Nothing is a story of lost childhood, the getting of wisdom, and the madness of crowds. The children are forced to confront the darkest answer to the question of existence, yet somehow find love and humanity in their responses. They absorb the horror of this communal experience, and move on through life, sadder and wiser, ever searching for truth and meaning.

Instrumentation
The opera is scored for the following orchestra:

Woodwinds 
3 Flutes (2nd doubling Piccolo)
3 Oboes (2nd doubling English Horn)
3 Clarinets (2nd doubling Bass clarinet)
3 Bassoons

Brass 
4 Horns
3 Trumpets
3 Trombones (all with F extension)

Percussion (4 players) 
Large orchestral Bass Drum (with Cymbal attached to side)
Large Tam-tam (with bow)
Marimba
Kit Bass Drum (optional)
Tambourine
Timpani
8" Splash Cymbal
Triangle
Crash Cymbal
Glockenspiel
Low tenor Steel Drum
Snare Drum
2 Large Stones
Sandpaper Blocks
Shekere
Suspended Cymbal with bow
Ruler

Harps and keyboards 
Harp
Harpsichord

Strings 
10 Violin I
8 Violin II
8 Violas
6 Cellos
4 Double basses

Critical response
The reviews for the opening production of Nothing were overwhelmingly positive. In a five star review, The Independent called the piece "a pretty well flawless piece which, unlike almost all other recent operas about adolescent alienation, rings true to life." Rupert Christiansen in The Telegraph said "The audience was held rapt by a performance that by any standards exerted a chilling power and intensity." Mark Pullinger of BachTrack.com said "Nothing is the most powerful contemporary opera I’ve seen since Written on Skin, which is high praise indeed."

Future productions

The original production of Nothing was revived by the Danish National Opera in Aarhus, Denmark in February 2017, as part of the European Capital of Culture celebrations.

Nothing was performed at the Copenhagen Opera House in 2020 as part of the Royal Danish Theatre's 2020/2021 season.

References 

Operas
2015 operas
Contemporary classical compositions
English-language operas
Operas based on novels